Canalone Miramonti is a World Cup slalom ski course in Italy, in Madonna di Campiglio, Trentino. It was designed by Bruno Detassis in 1940.

It is known as the slalom World Cup classic. It is one of the oldest, the most demanding and most prestigious slaloms in the world.

Slope has maximum incline at 31 degrees (60%). Swedish legend Ingemar Stenmark won the record five slalom events.

History
In 1940, Italian mountaineer and mountain guide Bruno Detassis (known as "King of the Brenta"), designed and constructed this famous slalom slope.

Since 1957,  the slope hosts one of the oldest and most prestigious international alpine ski competitions in the world known as 3-Tre, except in 1961.

Since 1967, the premiere World Cup season, it has been hosting several disciplines including slalom events, and since 1986 only slalom.

Men's 3-Tre events

World Cup

Women's World Cup
Tose events didn't count 3-Tre competition, replacing other venues only.

Course sections
Minicentrale, Diagonale, Entrata Canalone, Ginocchio, Muro

References

External links
World Cup – Madonna di Campiglio 
Ski-db.com - Madonna di Campiglio men's races

Skiing in Italy